Giannis Taralidis (born 17 May 1981) is a Greek former professional footballer who played as a midfielder.

Club career

Taralidis started his career by APS Almopos Arideas. In 1999, at the age of 18 started his professional career with the Paniliakos. He remained in the club until the first half of 2003-04 season. Paniliakos struggled between Super League and Football League during that period.

In January 2004, Taralidis signed with Olympiacos, in which he remained until 2007. During that period, Olympiacos had a squad of renowned players in the same position as Taralidis (Karembeu, Yaya Toure, Ieroklis Stoltidis, Pantelis Kafes) so it was not easy for a young player to get equal opportunities for playing. On 18 February 2005 he made his first appearance with the club in the UEFA Europa League in a victory 1–0 against FC Sochaux.

After 45 appearances with Olympiacos in all competitions, in the summer of 2007 he signed with OFI Crete made a total of 46 appearances with the club in the next 2 years in SuperLeague. In 2007, he participated with OFI Crete in UEFA Intertoto Cup. In the summer of 2008 had significant offers to join the two leading Cypriot football clubs Omonia and Anorthosis , but he denied due to family obligations and remained with his club, promoted to 3rd team captain. In 2009, he joined Levadiakos. In his first season, he participated in SuperLeague, but the next season due to relegation played in the Football League. In 2011, due to lack of offers, he signed with Glyfada, in Football League 2.
In 2012–2013, he played with Doxa Drama, in the Football League where he was also the team captain.

The summer of 2013 he signed a contract with Nea Salamina in the First Division in Cyprus. He was elected team captain. After half season in Nea Salamina, Taralidis signed a contract for six months with Ermis Aradippou, and renew his contract for a year.

Ermis Aradippou FC has been crowned Cypriot Super Cup champions after a 95th-minute winner from Taralidis earned them a 2–1 victory over APOEL FC – 3 minutes after the Nicosia outfit had levelled the match. The historic win, coming just two weeks after Ermis was knocked out of the UEFA Europa League third qualifying round by BSC Young Boys, marked their first-ever domestic trophy success. It also meant revenge on the big stage for Ermis, who lost to APOEL in the Cyprus Cup final last May. In summer 2015, he signed a year contract with Kissamikos.On 5 April 2016, he signed a year contract with another Cypriot club Karmiotissa for an undisclosed fee. On 23 June 2017, he returned to Ermis Aradippou signing a two-year contract.

International career
In 2001, he participated with Greece U21 in the Mediterranean Games. Additionally, he participated with the Greek Olympic team in the 2004 Olympic Games, playing all the games in the group stage. He scored on a draw play against South Korea, and in the game against Mexico.

Honours

Club
Olympiacos
Superleague Greece (3): 2004–05, 2005–06, 2006–07
Greek Cup (2): 2004–05, 2005–06, 
Greek Super Cup (1): 2007

Ermis Aradippou
Cypriot Super Cup (1): 2014

References

External links
Profile at epae.org
Taralidis biography by UEFA
 
Giannis Taralidis at Footballdatabase
Onsports.gr Profile

1981 births
Living people
Association football midfielders
Greek footballers
Greece youth international footballers
Greece under-21 international footballers
Footballers at the 2004 Summer Olympics
Olympic footballers of Greece
Super League Greece players
Cypriot First Division players
Paniliakos F.C. players
Olympiacos F.C. players
OFI Crete F.C. players
Levadiakos F.C. players
A.O. Glyfada players
Doxa Drama F.C. players
Nea Salamis Famagusta FC players
Ermis Aradippou FC players
Karmiotissa FC players
Footballers from Aridaia